"Tomorrow I'll Be OK" is a single by Belgian female singer Airis. The song was written by Yves Gaillard and Jo Casters. It was released in Belgium as a digital download on 8 July 2013. The song peaked at number 40 in Belgium.

Track listing
Digital download
 "Tomorrow I'll Be Ok" - 3:05

Chart performance

Weekly charts

Release history

References

2012 singles
Iris (singer) songs
2012 songs